A mermaid is a mythical creature with the upper body of a woman and the lower body of a fish. 

Mermaid may also refer to:

Places

Australia 
 Mermaid Beach, Queensland, a suburb of the Gold Coast
 Mermaid Reach, a reach of the Brisbane River, Queensland
 Mermaid Reef, one of three reefs that make up Rowley Shoals, Western Australia
 Mermaid Waters, Queensland, a suburb of the Gold Coast
 Mermaids Cave, Blue Mountains, New South Wales, a site where an unknown creature was found

United Kingdom 
 Mermaid Quay, a shopping and leisure complex in Cardiff Bay, Wales
 The Mermaid (river), a watercourse in Norfolk, England

Arts, entertainment, and media

Literature
 The Mermaid, alternative title for "The Little Mermaid" (Den lille havfrue) by Hans Christian Andersen

Films
 The Mermaid (1910 film), a 1910 film by the Thanhouser Company 
 The Mermaid (1965 film), a 1965 Hong Kong film
 Mermaids (1990 film), 1990 film starring Cher, Bob Hoskins, Winona Ryder and Christina Ricci
 Mermaids (soundtrack)
 Mermaid (1996 film), originally Rusalka, a 1996 animated short film by Aleksandr Petrov
 Mermaid (2000 film), directed by Peter Masterson
 Mermaids (2003 film), starring Erika Heynatz
 Mermaid (2007 film) (Russian: Русалка, Rusalka), 2007 film directed by Anna Melikian
Mermaids: The Body Found, a 2012 documentary-style television film
 The Mermaid (2016 film), a 2016 Chinese film

Music

Classical
 The Mermaid (ballad), from the 18th century
 Die Seejungfrau or The Mermaid, by Alexander von Zemlinsky
 The Mermaid, a choral song by Ralph Vaughan Williams (1872–1958)

Songs
 "Mermaid" (Hitomi Shimatani song)
 "Mermaid" (Train song), from their 2012 album California 37
 "Kanshō/Mermaid", a 2003 song by Aya Ueto
 "The Mermaid" (Shel Silverstein song), by Shel Silverstein

Visual artworks
 Mermaid (Roy Lichtenstein), a 1979 Roy Lichtenstein outdoor sculpture in Miami Beach
 Mermaid (Carl-Nielsen), a 1921 bronze sculpture
 The Mermaids (Kramskoi), an 1871 oil painting

Other arts, entertainment, and media
 Mermaid (Stafy), character from the Densetsu no Stafy video game
 Mermaid Series, editions of English Renaissance and Restoration dramatists (named after the Mermaid Tavern, above)
The Idle Mermaid, a 2014 South Korean romantic comedy television series

Brands and enterprises 
 Mermaids Casino, Las Vegas, Nevada
 Mermaids (charity), a UK charity which supports transgender youth
 The Mermaid Inn (disambiguation)

Science

 MERMAID, a marine scientific instrument platform, short for Mobile Earthquake Recorder for Marine Areas by Independent Divers

Vessels 
 Mermaid (dinghy), a sailing dinghy designed by Roger Hancock
 Mermaid, Kenichi Horie's first solo voyage sailboat
 CZAW Mermaid, an amphibious flying boat aircraft
 Dublin Bay Mermaid, a class of sailing dinghy originated by Dublin Bay Sailing Club, Ireland
 HMAS Mermaid (A 02), a 1989 Royal Australian Navy survey motor launch
 HMS Mermaid, various ships in the British Royal Navy
  Mermaid-class destroyer, a class of two Royal Navy destroyers in the First World War
  Mermaid-class frigate, a class of six sailing warships built in the eighteenth century.
 Seaview Mermaid, a class of racing keelboat based at the Sea View Yacht Club, Isle of Wight

Other uses 
 Mermaid (Ninurta), in Sumerian mythology, one of the Heroes slain by Ninurta
 Mermaid, a hybrid tea rose cultivar
 Fiji mermaid, a hoax presented by PT Barnum
 Mermaid Syndrome or Sirenomelia, a congenital deformity that gives an appearance of a mermaid
 Mermaiding, wearing a costume mermaid tail, often while swimming
 Mermaid (software), a software to generate diagrams from text in a similar manner as Markdown
 Mermaid is the ICAO radio callsign of Air Alsie, a small airline and charter company based in Sonderborg, Denmark

See also
 Merman